The 2017–18 Bayer 04 Leverkusen season was the 114th season in the football club's history and 39th consecutive and overall season in the top flight of German football, the Bundesliga, having been promoted from the 2. Bundesliga Nord in 1979. In addition to the domestic league, Bayer Leverkusen also participated in this season's edition of the domestic cup, the DFB-Pokal. This was the 60th season for Leverkusen in the BayArena, located in Leverkusen, North Rhine-Westphalia, Germany. The season covers a period from 1 July 2017 to 30 June 2018.

Kits

Players

Squad information

Competitions

Overview

Bundesliga

League table

Results summary

Results by round

Matches

DFB-Pokal

Statistics

Appearances and goals

|-
! colspan=14 style=background:#dcdcdc; text-align:center| Goalkeepers

|-
! colspan=14 style=background:#dcdcdc; text-align:center| Defenders

|-
! colspan=14 style=background:#dcdcdc; text-align:center| Midfielders

|-
! colspan=14 style=background:#dcdcdc; text-align:center| Forwards

|-
! colspan=14 style=background:#dcdcdc; text-align:center| Players transferred out during the season

References

Bayer 04 Leverkusen seasons
Leverkusen, Bayer 04